Saint of Circumstance is a live album by the rock band the Grateful Dead.  It contains the complete concert recorded at Giants Stadium in East Rutherford, New Jersey on June 17, 1991.  It was released on September 27, 2019, on three CDs or five LPs.  The same recording was also released the same day as part of the 14-CD album Giants Stadium 1987, 1989, 1991.

A video of this concert was shown in theaters on August 1, 2019 as that year's Grateful Dead Meet-Up at the Movies.

Critical reception 
On AllMusic, Timothy Monger wrote, "A somewhat legendary taper's classic, the band's second night at New Jersey's 80,000 capacity Giants Stadium in the summer of 1991 was a predictably unpredictable behemoth lauded more for its oddities than overall cohesion. Boasting the relatively short-lived two-man keyboard battery of Bruce Hornsby (piano, accordion) and Vince Welnick (synths), the show's lush tonal palette was a hallmark of this era.... ["Dark Star"] seems to exist as more of a spiritual undercurrent, spurring on other improvisations, some of which get quite heady."

Track listing 
Disc 1
First set:
"Eyes of the World" > (Jerry Garcia, Robert Hunter) – 15:26
"Walkin' Blues" (Robert Johnson, arranged by Bob Weir) – 7:01
"Brown-Eyed Women" (Garcia, Hunter) – 6:10
"Dark Star" > (Garcia, Mickey Hart, Bill Kreutzmann, Phil Lesh, Ron McKernan, Weir, Hunter) – 1:32
"When I Paint My Masterpiece" (Bob Dylan) – 5:28
"Loose Lucy" (Garcia, Hunter) – 9:16
"Cassidy" (Weir, John Perry Barlow) – 7:11
"Might as Well" (Garcia, Hunter) – 6:41
Disc 2
Second set:
"Saint of Circumstance" > (Weir, Barlow) – 10:55
"Ship of Fools" > (Garcia, Hunter) – 8:01
"Dark Star" > (Garcia, Hart, Kreutzmann, Lesh, McKernan, Weir, Hunter) – 1:14
"Truckin'" > (Garcia, Lesh, Weir, Hunter) – 6:55
"New Speedway Boogie" > (Garcia, Hunter) – 9:12
"Dark Star" > (Garcia, Hart, Kreutzmann, Lesh, McKernan, Weir, Hunter) – 0:55
"Uncle John's Band" > (Garcia, Hunter) – 11:18
"Dark Star" > (Garcia, Hart, Kreutzmann, Lesh, McKernan, Weir, Hunter) – 8:05
"Drums" (Hart, Kreutzmann) – 12:30
Disc 3
"Space" > (Garcia, Lesh, Weir) – 8:47
"China Doll" > (Garcia, Hunter) – 5:07
"Playing in the Band" > (Weir, Hart, Hunter) – 4:35
"Sugar Magnolia" (Weir, Hunter) – 10:53
Encore:
"The Weight" (Robbie Robertson) – 6:20

Personnel 
Grateful Dead
Jerry Garcia – guitar, vocals
Bob Weir – guitar, vocals
Phil Lesh – bass, vocals
Bill Kreutzmann – drums
Mickey Hart – drums
Vince Welnick – keyboards, vocals
Bruce Hornsby – keyboards, vocals
Production
Produced by Grateful Dead
Produced for release by David Lemieux
Recording: John Cutler
Mixing: Jeffrey Norman
Mastering: David Glasser
Engineering: Dave Hewitt, Dave Roberts, Jamie Howarth
Art direction, design: Lisa Glines, Doran Tyson, Steve Vance
Photos: David Rae Morris, James R. Anderson, Bob Minkin

Charts

References 

Grateful Dead live albums
Rhino Records live albums
2019 live albums